Feia Lacus is one of a number of hydrocarbon seas and lakes found on Saturn's largest moon, Titan. It was named in 2007 on the basis of data taken by the space probe Cassini.
The lake is located at latitude 73.7°N and longitude 64.41° W on Titan's globe, and is composed of liquid methane and ethane. At 47 km in length it is moderately sized. It is named after Lagoa Feia in Brazil.

Notes

References

Lakes of Titan (moon)